Iain Harnden (born 23 September 1976) is a retired male hurdler from Zimbabwe. He represented his native African country at the 2000 Summer Olympics in Sydney, Australia and the 2001 World Championships in Edmonton, Alberta, Canada.

References

External links

1976 births
Living people
Sportspeople from Harare
White Zimbabwean sportspeople
Zimbabwean male hurdlers
Athletes (track and field) at the 2000 Summer Olympics
Olympic athletes of Zimbabwe
Zimbabwean people of British descent